Puerto Rico v. Shell Co. (P. R.), Ltd., 302 U.S. 253 (1937), was a notable Supreme Court of the United States case.  The issue was whether a local ("insular") law could be pre-empted by the Commerce clause of the United States Constitution.  It was also notable as being one of the first cases that determined that Puerto Rico can be treated as if a state for some purposes under the law.  It has become a precedent for similar cases.

See also

 Competition law
 Dormant Commerce Clause
 List of United States Supreme Court cases, volume 302
 Bibb v. Navajo Freight Lines, Inc.
 Federal preemption

References

External links
 
 Supreme Court list of cases, 1926-1948

United States Supreme Court cases
Legal history of Puerto Rico
Royal Dutch Shell litigation
1937 in United States case law
United States Supreme Court cases of the Hughes Court